Angels & Queens is the debut studio album by Compton, California soul trio Gabriels, set to be released in two parts by Atlas Artists and Parlophone. The first part was released on September 30, 2022, and the second part will be released in March 2023. The album was produced by the trio and hip hop producer Sounwave, and was announced on September 7, 2022, along with the release of the title track as its lead single.

Background 
In a press release about Part I, the band called it a "unique exploration of love and loss from each of our differing perspectives" which they "were planning to release ... next year, but got the opportunity to collaborate with some of the most amazing people who initially were strangers, but within weeks became family in the most mind blowing process. As the first part of the album was recorded, we knew we wanted to share it with you as soon as possible." Producer Sounwave said he was "instantly drawn in from the raw emotions and how limitless their range was. For this project we wanted to push the boundaries sonically that matched the intense and vulnerable feelings of each song."

Style and reception 

The Guardians Alexis Petridis opens his review of Part I by questioning if the project could be album of the year, calling frontman Jacob Lusk "nothing short of incredible" and the album "a powerful half-hour of top-tier songwriting that proves Gabriels are far more than soul revivalists." Petridis focuses praise on "the sound of [Lusk's] voice multitracked to infinity" on piano ballad "If You Only Knew" and the "dense funk" of that song and the title track. Producer Sounwave "helps craft a sound that feels entirely of the moment", shown through the backing instrumental of "The Blind" which "is made of a stumbling, clattering array of samples" with vocals "drenched in backwards reverb" and "the piano and strings battl[ing] for space with droning, overcast synths"; and "To the Moon and Back" which opens with orchestration which "could have transported there directly from a 1940s jazz ballad" but is "swiftly replaced by a cavernous-sounding swirl of massed vocals and an insistent, cyclical bass riff."

The Arts Desks Peter Quinn calls the project "a collection of seven songs which take you on very different emotional journeys, with structures that take surprising twists and turns and redemptive codas that make your hair stand on end", highlighting the "monstrous snare hits, hysterical strings, forceful horn stabs and hypnotically repeating piano lines" of "Taboo" as "like what might have ensued if J Dilla had chopped up a slice of Philly soul", as well as the "horns surreptitiously sliding into the texture" of "Remember Me" and the "impressively vast wall of vocal harmonies which threatens to bring "Mama" crashing down". The Daily Telegraphs James Hall calls the album "intricately arranged and replete with daring orchestrations", saying it "somehow manages to comprise mid-paced music you can dance to and dance rhythms you can chill to." Hope and Balouzian "bring depth and nuance to every track."

Albumisms Patrick Corcoran says the album "clocks in at a sparse 27 minutes, but those minutes pack a punch far greater than you might expect." Dazeds Emmanuel Onapa calls the album "a rare exploration of love and loss through [the trio's] collective but different perspectives, melding a range of styles from classic R&B, jazz, soul and gospel filled with hope and euphoria." The Independents Kevin EG Perry says that Lusk "channels Nina Simone and Billie Holiday as he wrings every drop of emotion from the group's songs of love and loss."

Year-end lists

Track listing

Personnel

Part I 
 Jacob Lusk – vocals
 Ari Balouzian – piano, synthesizer, violin, viola, cello, string arrangement
 Sounwave – drum programming, timpani
 Sam Beste – additional production, piano, synthesizer
 Matt Schaeffer – drums, guitar
 Trevor Estes – drums, percussion
 John Anderson – engineer, guitar, bass
 Malik Taylor – French horn
 Max Whipple – horns arrangement, bass
 Fabio Santana De Souza and Garret Smith – trombone
 Todd M. Simon – trumpet, flugelhorn
 P. Blake Cooper – tuba
 Neil Charles – bass
 Anthony Patler – organ, synthesizer, bass
 Isaiah Gage – cello
 Rico Nichols – drums
 Mike Haldemann – guitar
 George Janho, Richard Woodcraft, and Ryan Nasci – engineers
 Beach Noise – mixing engineer
 Matt Colton and Mike Hillier – mastering engineers

Charts

References 

2022 debut albums
Gabriels albums
Albums produced by Sounwave
Parlophone albums
Soul albums by American artists